Anthony Corbett is a Jamaican football player. He played as defender.

Career
The influential Corbett has won a Jamaica National Premier League title with Hazard United in 1993.

International career
Corbett earned several caps for the Reggae Boyz in the 1980s and early 1990s and also captained the national team. He is regarded as one of the finest Jamaican defenders of all time. Corbett is well respected both on and off the football field and coaches young athletes in his spare time.

Boca United
Corbett started coaching a soccer association in Boca Raton Florida. He is greatly respected there. He has trained many children and has helped them excel to their fullest potential. He has stopped coaching there in 2012 due to an incident that he had with a parent.

Parkland Soccer Club
He is currently coaching the 06' boys team in Parkland.

References

1961 births
Living people
Jamaican footballers
Jamaica international footballers
Portmore United F.C. players
1991 CONCACAF Gold Cup players
1993 CONCACAF Gold Cup players
Association football defenders
National Premier League players